"You Deserve Better" is a song by British singer James Arthur, released as a double A-side single with "At My Weakest" on 1 June 2018 through Columbia Records. The song was written by Arthur, TMS and Camille Purcell, and produced by TMS.

Background and composition
"You Deserve Better" was recorded by James Arthur for his third studio album, now titled You, but never made the official track listing. Arthur wrote the track along with TMS and Camille Purcell. It was released as part of a promotional double A-side titled "You Deserve Better"/"At My Weakest" on 1 June 2018. The lyrics of the song tell of a man who believes that his lover would be better off without him.

Live performances
In June 2018, Arthur performed "You Deserve Better" live on The Voice Australia and at the Summertime Ball.

Chart performance
After being released, "You Deserve Better" entered at number 53 on the UK Singles Chart.

Charts

Certifications

References

2018 songs
James Arthur songs
2018 singles
Songs written by Kamille (musician)
Songs written by Tom Barnes (songwriter)
Songs written by Peter Kelleher (songwriter)
Songs written by James Arthur
Song recordings produced by TMS (production team)
Songs written by Ben Kohn